Simon Patterson may refer to:
Simon Patterson (artist) (born 1967), English artist
Simon Patterson (footballer) (1982–2006), English footballer